Mederer GmbH is the fourth largest manufacturer of gummi candy in Germany behind Haribo, Storck and Katjes. Mederer´s most popular brand is Trolli, a brand launched in 1975. Mederer GmbH also owns several other brands, notably Efrutti, Sugarland and Gummi Bear Factory.

The company was founded in 1948.

Altogether, these brands produce gummi candy, licorice and marshmallows in well over one hundred shapes, sizes and flavors.

Mederer employs roughly 2500 people in factories and offices located in Germany, China, Spain, Czech Republic, United States.

References 

http://www.wer-zu-wem.de/firma/mederer.html

https://web.archive.org/web/20110810143429/http://firmeneintrag.de/einkaufen-bestellen/suesswaren/907-fuerth/mederer-suesswarenvertriebs-gmbh

External links 
 www.trolli.de
 http://www.efrutti.com/

Confectioners
Food and drink companies of Germany
Food and drink companies established in 1948
Companies based in Bavaria